Strum Graz is an Austrian football club based in Graz. During the 2017–18 campaign Strum Graz were competing in the following competitions: Bundesliga, Austrian Cup, UEFA Europa League.

Club Friendlies

Competitions

Bundesliga

League table

Results summary

Results by matchday

Matches

Austrian Cup

UEFA Europa League

External links 
 Official Website
Sturm Graz at UEFA.COM
Sturm Graz at EUFO.DE
Sturm Graz at Weltfussball.de
Sturm Graz at Football Squads.co.uk
Sturm Graz at National Football Teams.com
Sturm Graz at Football-Lineups.com
 Onlinenews about Sturm Graz

Sturm Graz
2017-2018